Erythronium rostratum, the yellow fawnlily or golden-star, is a plant species native to the south-central part of the United States (Kansas, Missouri, Oklahoma, Ohio, Texas, Alabama, Arkansas, Kentucky, Louisiana, and Tennessee).

Erythronium rostratum produces egg-shaped bulbs up to 20 mm long. Leaves are lanceolate, up to 20 cm long. Scape is up to 10 cm tall, bearing one yellow flower.

References

External links
 
 photo of herbarium specimen at Missouri Botanical Garden,  Erythronium rostratum, collected in Missouri

rostratum
Flora of the United States
Plants described in 1941